Captain J. R. S. Brown was the 2nd Commander of the Royal Ceylon Navy. He was appointed on 26 November 1951 until 14 June 1953. He was succeeded by P. M. B. Chavasse.

References

Commanders of the Navy (Sri Lanka)